Samuel Parker may refer to:

Samuel Parker (bishop of Oxford) (1640–1688), English bishop and theologian
Samuel Parker (writer) (1681–1730), English writer and publisher
Samuel Parker (bishop of Massachusetts) (1744–1804), Episcopal bishop of Massachusetts, United States
Samuel Parker (Hawaii politician) (1853–1920), heir to the Parker Ranch estate and politician in Hawaii
Samuel Parker (missionary) (1779–1866), missionary in Oregon Country from New York, United States
Samuel Parker (Oregon politician) (1806–1886), pioneer and politician in the Oregon Territory, United States
Samuel Parker (footballer) (1872–?), Scottish footballer
Sam Parker (footballer, born 1924) (1924–2020), English footballer, full back for Accrington Stanley, Barnsley and Crewe Alexandra 
Samuel Parker (wrestler) (born 1931), Australian Olympic wrestler
Samuel D. Parker (attorney) (1781–1873), American attorney who served as District Attorney of Suffolk County, Massachusetts
Samuel D. Parker (soldier) (1868–1953), American militia officer in the Massachusetts Volunteer Militia and the State Guard of Massachusetts
Samuel W. Parker (1805–1859), politician from Indiana
Samuel I. Parker (1891–1975), United States Army officer and Medal of Honor recipient
Samuel Hale Parker (1781–1864), American music publisher
Sam Y. Parker (1880–1906), college football and baseball player
Sam Parker (actor), radio announcer and voice actor, the voice of Gulliver in the 1939 film Gulliver's Travels
Sam Parker, character in After Five

See also
Samuel Parks (disambiguation)
Samuel Parkes (disambiguation)